Clinospermatinae is a subtribe of plants in the family Arecaceae.

Genera:
Cyphokentia
Clinosperma

References

 
Arecaceae subtribes